Breiðabólsstaðarkirkja is a Lutheran church at Breiðabólsstaður in Vestur-Húnavatnssýsla, Iceland. 

The present church was built on timber in 1893, although the site dates back to around 1100.  Hafliði Másson lived at Breiðabólstaður ca 1100.  Jón Arason  (1484–1550) was linked to the church in the 16th century.

References

External links
Breiðabólsstaðarkirkja on the Icelandic Church Map

Churches in Iceland
Churches completed in 1893